AutoZone Park is a Minor League Baseball stadium located in downtown Memphis, Tennessee, and is home to the Memphis Redbirds of the International League and Memphis 901 FC of the USL Championship. The Redbirds are the Triple-A affiliate of Major League Baseball's (MLB) St. Louis Cardinals. In 2009, the stadium was named Minor League Ballpark of the Year by Baseball America.

History
Designed by Looney Ricks Kiss Architects of Memphis with Kansas City-based HOK Sport, AutoZone Park cost $80.5 million to build. This is by far the most money ever spent on a structure dedicated to a minor league baseball team.
AutoZone Park was built to "MLB standards", but with the absence of outfield seats or food vendors far down the foul lines, making it, for comparison purposes, a major league stadium with only the 'good' seats". It opened in 2000, replacing Tim McCarver Stadium.  The stadium also hosts some games for the University of Memphis baseball team, and most notably, the annual game with Ole Miss.

The Redbirds had been unique in baseball until recently, in that they were owned  by a non-profit community foundation, the Memphis Redbirds Foundation;  the Green Bay Packers of the NFL have a similar ownership structure. However, the Foundation defaulted on its bond payment in 2010. On November 15, 2013, the Foundation announced that the default would be remedied by the St. Louis Cardinals paying off the bonds at a discount and acquiring the Redbirds, while the city of Memphis resumes ownership of the stadium.

The stadium hosted the 2003 Triple-A All-Star Game in which the International League All-Stars defeated the Pacific Coast League All-Stars, 13–9.

In October 2004 and 2005 AutoZone Park was home to the Greater Mid-South Jaycees Field of Screams Haunted House.

In October 2005, AutoZone Park became the first venue outside of New Orleans to host the Voodoo Music Experience.  One day of this music festival was moved to Memphis due to Hurricane Katrina.

On December 4, 2006, at the Major League Baseball Winter Meetings, MLB announced that an exhibition game to be called the Civil Rights Game would be held at AutoZone Park, with the first game on March 31, 2007. The game featured the Cardinals and the Cleveland Indians, with the Cardinals winning, 5–1. The second game was played on March 29, 2008, between the Chicago White Sox and the New York Mets. The Mets defeated the White Sox, 3–2.

On August 31, 2008, the ballpark's largest crowd to date witnessed the Redbirds lose to the Oklahoma RedHawks, 10–7, in front of 18,620 fans.

AutoZone Park was the site of the 2016 Triple-A National Championship Game in which the Scranton/Wilkes-Barre RailRiders, champions of the International League, defeated the PCL-champion El Paso Chihuahuas, 3–1, before a crowd of 9,471 people on September 20. The stadium once again hosted the championship game on September 17, 2019, in which the PCL's Sacramento River Cats defeated the Columbus Clippers, 4-0, with 9,123 on hand.

Size
AutoZone Park has a seating capacity of 10,000, and has been aptly described as "one-third" of a major league baseball park.

For its construction  of concrete were used, or enough to cover . The outfield contains  of sod. The infield is capable of draining  of rain per hour. while remaining playable, which means that the field only rarely has to be covered during games.

AutoZone Park also has one of the largest video screens in minor league baseball. On January 10, 2012 the Memphis Commercial Appeal reported that the Redbirds planned to install a  full HD video display, replacing the old video screen. The new video board will be the largest in Minor League Baseball.

Amenities
AutoZone Park contains several special seating sections designed to give patrons a variety of viewing options.

The Family Leisure Picnic Pavilion is located on the east  of the park, and contains several picnic tables and space for vending food. It is commonly used for special event hosting, and can seat up to 500 people.
The Bluffs, located in each corner of the park has grass covered lawn seating, and tickets to this area are sold cheaply, but in limited numbers. It is a favorite spot for many fans because of the picnic atmosphere. Chairs are not allowed on the Bluff.
The upper club levels contain 700 seats in 48 suites, and are generally reserved to groups or local companies. Many larger Memphis companies retain one suite for the entire season, for all games.
The normal club seating have access to an air conditioned concourse, along with several restaurants and bars located on the concourse itself.
In total, the ballpark has 1,600 club seats.
There are two open-air party decks, each of which seats up to 175 people, and three pre-game balconies.

Attendance records
AutoZone Park's single-game attendance record was set on August 31, 2008, for a game between the Redbirds and the Oklahoma RedHawks in front of a sellout crowd of 18,620 people. The park's season attendance record of 887,976 and average attendance record of 12,507 were both set in 2001. Attendance records through the completion of the 2019 season are as follows.

Single-game attendance
Bold indicates the winner of each game.

Season attendance

References

External links

Memphis Redbirds: AutoZone Park
AutoZone Park Views - Ball Parks of the Minor Leagues

Memphis Redbirds
Minor league baseball venues
Sports venues in Memphis, Tennessee
Baseball venues in Tennessee
Soccer venues in Tennessee
2000 establishments in Tennessee
Sports venues completed in 2000
Memphis 901 FC
International League ballparks